Coleophora echyropis is a moth of the family Coleophoridae. It is found in Kashmir.

The wingspan is about 14 mm. The antennae are white ringed fuscous and the palpi are white. The forewings are light greyish-ochreous. There is a broad white streak with two or three black specks running along the costa. The apical third of the wing is suffusedly mixed white, with a very few black specks between the veins. There is also a slender whitish-grey streak in the posterior half of the cell, with a few black scales and a greyish line with some black scales along the fold. The hindwings are grey.

References

echyropis
Moths of Asia
Moths described in 1939